Daviot Castle was a 15th-century castle, about  southeast of Inverness, Highland, Scotland, and west of the River Nairn at Daviot. Also known as Strathnairn Castle, its remains are designated as a Scheduled Ancient Monument.

History
A castle was built at the property by the Moravia family.

The later castle was constructed by the Lindsay Earls of Crawford, probably David Lindsay, 1st Earl of Crawford. The Mackintoshes acquired it and built the house nearby.

A green-veined stone axe head was found on the property in 1856 and was exhibited by Archaeological Institute of Great Britain and Ireland in Edinburgh.

Structure
Daviot Castle had both a keep and a courtyard. It is thought that it occupied the flat top of the small promontory which runs north from the present Daviot House.  There were steep natural slopes defending it to the north, west and east. There were a dry-ditch and drawbridge, probably to the south, but there is now no trace of this ditch. The castle was probably square in shape with four circular towers on its corners. The walls, towers and part of the gate were still intact at the beginning of the 18th century and the ruins still existed in 1840. They were subsequently destroyed to provide lime for manure.

The surviving remains consist of a  tower of rubbled masonry, a stub section of adjacent curtain wall, and the foundations of the south east tower.

References

Castles in Highland (council area)